Overall, rates of crime in Spain are high in comparison to other European countries. In 2022 it was listed as number two out of 35 states in Europe, although in 2020 it had a lower homicide rate than the European Union average.

Crime by type

Theft 
Instances of robbery are particularly widespread in Spain, as of 2020 Spain had the second highest recorded instances of theft in the EU. One of the often cited reasons for this is a national law that states that theft of anything worth less than €400 ($459) is not a crime, but a misdemeanor. Additionally offenses for theft of anything valued less than 400 euro are not accumulated to result in more serious charges. So criminals can continue to rob and steal without risk of serious consequences beyond a small fine.

Homicide

In 2020, Spain had a homicide rate of 0.64 per 100,000 population, making it the 6th lowest among 30 European countries and lower than the European Union average of 0.9. There were a total of 298 homicides in Spain in 2020. Many terrorist attacks have occurred in Spain, the most deadly of which was the 2004 Madrid train bombings. 

Asturias, in Northern Spain, has one of the countries' lowest crime rates. With a population of 1 million people, it registered only 1 homicide during 2021. Its biggest city, Gijón, with more than 250,000 inhabitants, has not registered a homicide since February 2020 (as of June 2022), before COVID-19 lockdown.

Drug-related crime 
Spain is the principal route of entry of drugs and narcotics into the European Union. Indeed, about half of the cocaine found by law enforcement agencies in Europe is found by Spanish police. Spain has a high number of drug users, leading the table of cocaine users in Europe.

Cocaine importation 
Cocaine usage in Spain is high by world standards. Spain is a major transit point for cocaine entering Europe. After arrival in Spain, much of the cocaine is then trafficked to other countries. In 2005, over 50% of the cocaine found by police in Europe was found by Spanish police. The so-called Galician mafia is the main trafficker of cocaine into Spain and to European countries such as the United Kingdom.

Background level of crime against tourists 
The US Department of State's Bureau of Consular Affairs advised travellers in 2011 that Spain had a "moderate rate of crime". Street crimes against tourists occur in the principal tourist areas. Madrid and Barcelona, in particular, report incidents of "pick-pocketing, mugging, and occasional violent attacks". In Madrid, incidents have been reported in "all major tourist areas, including the area near the Prado Museum, near Atocha train station, in Retiro Park, in areas of old Madrid including near the Royal Palace, and in Plaza Mayor". In Barcelona, the largest number of incidents reported also occurred in major tourist areas.

In 2019, the Embassy of the United States in Spain issued a warning to its nationals against the increasing violent crime in Barcelona. The embassy highlighted crimes, which were recently committed in the most popular tourist places, such as, the theft of jewelry, money and watches. These offenses have physically harmed the victims in some cases.

Crime statistics 
Crime statistics for Spain are published annually by the Instituto Nacional de Estadística. Different agencies of Spain and the European Union conduct analysis of the crime data in Spain. Statistics show Spain is one of the European countries with the lowest crime rate, according to a 2005 Gallop Europe research study. The rate of misdemeanours and crimes in Spain was 46 per 1,000 people in 2009. In 2013 Spain had one of the lowest crime rates in Europe.

See also 

 Spain's law enforcement agencies

References

External links
 Foreign and Commonwealth Office UK. Travel and Living Abroad - Spain
 United Nations Seventh Survey of Crime Trends and Operations of Criminal Justice Systems, covering the period 1998 - 2000
 John Gordon Ross' Blog. Spain and Portugal for visitors - Sense and Sensibility - Crime and Safety in Spain
 European Commission - Eurostat: Crime statistics